The 2011 Manitoba Scotties Tournament of Hearts, Manitoba's women's provincial curling championship, was held January 26–30 in Altona, Manitoba at the Sunflower Gardens Arena. The winning Cathy Overton-Clapham team represented Manitoba at the 2011 Scotties Tournament of Hearts in Charlottetown, Prince Edward Island. The team went 4-7 in round robin play.

Teams

The sixteen Manitoba Safeway qualifiers are selected through the 1-9 rural zones, the 10-14 Winnipeg zones, the winning team from the Berth Bonspiel, and the CurlManitoba Women's Bonspiel winner from the previous 2009-2010 season.

Asham Black Group

Red Brick Red Group

Standings

Asham Black Group

Red Brick Red Group

Draw 1
January 26, 8:30 AM CT

Draw 2
January 26, 12:15 PM CT

Draw 3
January 26, 4:00 PM CT

Draw 4
January 26, 8:15 PM CT

Draw 5
January 27, 8:30 AM CT

Draw 6
January 27, 12:15 PM CT

Draw 7
January 27, 4:00 PM CT

Draw 8
January 27, 7:45 PM CT

Draw 9
January 28, 8:30 AM CT

Draw 10
January 28, 12:15 PM CT

Draw 11
January 28, 4:00 PM CT

Draw 12
January 28, 7:45 PM CT

Draw 13
January 29, 8:30 AM CT

Draw 14
January 29, 12:15 PM CT

Tie Breaker 1
January 29, 4:00 PM CT

Tie Breaker 2
January 29, 7:30 PM CT

Playoffs

B1 vs. R1
January 30, 8:30 AM CT

B2 vs. R2
January 30, 8:30 AM CT

Semifinal
January 30, 12:15 PM CT

Final
January 30, 4:00 PM CT

References

Manitoba
Curling in Manitoba
Scotties Tournament of Hearts
Manitoba Scotties Tournament of Hearts
Manitoba Scotties Tournament of Hearts